The 2016 CAF Champions League group stage was played from 18 June to 24 August 2016. A total of eight teams competed in the group stage to decide the four places in the knockout stage of the 2016 CAF Champions League.

Draw

The draw for the group stage was held on 24 May 2016, 14:30 EET (UTC+2), at the CAF headquarters in Cairo, Egypt. The eight teams were drawn into two groups of four.

The eight teams, all winners of the second round, were seeded by their performances in the CAF competitions for the previous five seasons (CAF 5-Year Ranking points shown in parentheses): two teams in Pot 1, two teams in Pot 2, two teams in Pot 3, and two teams in Pot 4. One team from each of the four pots were drawn into each group, with each team then assigned a random "position" in the group to determine the fixtures.

Format

In the group stage, each group was played on a home-and-away round-robin basis. The winners and runners-up of each group advanced to the semi-finals.

Tiebreakers

The teams were ranked according to points (3 points for a win, 1 point for a draw, 0 points for a loss). If tied on points, tiebreakers would be applied in the following order (Regulations III. 20 & 21):
Number of points obtained in games between the teams concerned;
Goal difference in games between the teams concerned;
Goals scored in games between the teams concerned;
Away goals scored in games between the teams concerned;
If, after applying criteria 1 to 4 to several teams, two teams still have an equal ranking, criteria 1 to 4 are reapplied exclusively to the matches between the two teams in question to determine their final rankings. If this procedure does not lead to a decision, criteria 6 to 9 apply;
Goal difference in all games;
Goals scored in all games;
Away goals scored in all games;
Drawing of lots.

Schedule
The schedule of each matchday was as follows.

Groups

Group A

Group B

References

External links
Orange CAF Champions League 2016, CAFonline.com

2